USS Darter (SS-227), a Gato-class submarine, was the first ship of the United States Navy to be named for the darter.

Construction and commissioning
Darter′s keel was laid down on 20 October 1942 by the Electric Boat Company of Groton, Connecticut. She was launched on 6 June 1943, sponsored by Mrs. E. B. Wheeler, wife of Edwin B. Wheeler, Shipbuilding Manager of Electric Boat, and commissioned on 7 September 1943.

World War II
Darter put out from New London, Connecticut on 31 October 1943 for Pearl Harbor, arriving on 26 November.

First patrol
On 21 December 1943, she cleared harbor on her first war patrol, bound for the heavily traveled shipping lanes south and west of Truk. This patrol was twice interrupted for repairs, at Pearl Harbor from 29 December 1943 – 3 January 1944, and at Tulagi and Milne Bay from 30 January–8 February. She performed a reconnaissance of Eniwetok on 12 January, and the next day scored a torpedo hit on a large ship, only to receive a severe depth-charging from her target’s escorts. She stood by on patrol during the carrier air strikes on Truk of 16–17 February, then fueled at Milne Bay on her way to refit at Brisbane from 29 February-17 March. She suffered her only casualty of the war during this refit when Motor Machinist's Mate, Second Class Robert Richard Gould, Jr. was electrocuted.

Second patrol
On her way to her second war patrol north of Western New Guinea and south of Davao, Darter topped off fuel at Milne Bay on 21–22 March 1944. On 30 March, she sank a ship, then patrolled off New Guinea during Allied landings on its coast. She put into Darwin to refuel on 29–30 April, then returned to her patrol area until 23 May, when she arrived at Manus Island.

Third patrol
Refitted, she put out for action waters once more on 21 June on her third war patrol off Halmahera and Mindanao.

Fourth patrol

Returning to Brisbane on 8 August 1944, Darter cleared on her fourth and last war patrol. She searched the Celebes Sea and South China Sea, returned to Darwin to fuel and make minor repairs on 10 September, and put back to the Celebes Sea. She attacked a tanker convoy on 12 October, and on 21 October headed with Dace for Balabac Strait to watch for Japanese shipping moving to reinforce the Philippines or attack the landing forces.

In an outstanding performance of duty, which was to award both submarines the Navy Unit Commendation and Darters commanding officer, David Hayward McClintock, the Navy Cross, Darter and Dace made contact with the Japanese Center Force approaching Palawan Passage on 23 October. Immediately, Darter flashed the contact report, one of the most important of the war, since the location of this Japanese task force had been unknown for some days. The two submarines closed the task force, and with attacks on the cruisers of Center Force, initiated the attacks in the Palawan Passage, the first action of the decisive Battle for Leyte Gulf. Darter sank the heavy cruiser  and seriously damaged the cruiser . With Dace, she tracked the damaged cruiser through the tortuous channels of Palawan Passage until just after midnight of 24–25 October when Darter grounded on Bombay Shoal .

As efforts to get the submarine off the shoal began, the  closed, unsuccessfully tried to tow her off the reef or to destroy her, but then sailed on. With the tide receding, all Daces and Darters efforts to get her off failed. All confidential papers and equipment were destroyed, and the entire crew taken off to Dace. When the demolition charges planted in Darter failed to destroy her, Dace fired torpedoes which exploded on the reef due to the shallow water. Dace did, however, score 21 hits with her  gun.  was called in and fired 10 torpedoes at Darter with similar lack of success. Finally,  arrived on 31 October and scored 55 hits with her  guns. Her report states, "It is doubtful that any equipment in DARTER at 1130 this date would be of any value to Japan - except as scrap. Estimated draft of DARTER - 4 feet." With the scuttling occurring late in the war, the Japanese made no further efforts to recover the wreck, and her hulk remained remarkably intact as late as 1962.

Dace reached Fremantle safely with Darters men on 6 November.

Postwar
In January 1952 a salvage party from the US Navy arrived at the wreck to dispose of the six torpedoes left on board in the forward torpedo room. Charges were placed around the torpedoes, and the resulting detonation blew off the entire bow. As of 1998 her badly deteriorated remains protrude above the surface on the reef.

Awards
In addition to the Navy Unit Commendation, Darter received four battle stars earned during her four war patrols, the last three of which were designated as "successful".

References

External links
hazegray.org: USS Darter
navsource.org: USS Darter
On Eternal Patrol: USS Darter
Kill record: USS Darter

Gato-class submarines
World War II submarines of the United States
United States submarine accidents
Lost submarines of the United States
World War II shipwrecks in the South China Sea
Shipwrecks of the Philippines
Ships built in Groton, Connecticut
1943 ships
Maritime incidents in October 1944